The 1993 New England Patriots season was the franchise’s 34th season overall and 24th in the National Football League (NFL). The Patriots finished fourth in the AFC East Division with a record of five wins and eleven losses.

Offseason

Sweeping off-field changes
The Patriots closed their previous season with a 2—14 record amidst off-field turmoil. An unfavorable stadium deal without parking and luxury box revenues meant that the Patriots could not be competitive financially without a new facility. Owner James Orthwein demanded that Boston build a domed stadium downtown, and NFL Commissioner Paul Tagliabue said that time to build a new stadium was running out. Suspicion that the Patriots would move to St. Louis and become began during the 1992 season, and intensified as bidding for the league’s two 1995 expansion franchises heated up, with the general belief that the Patriots would be moved to St. Louis as the Stallions if that city lost its expansion bid. There was also a proposal from businessman Fran Murray to move the team to Hartford, Connecticut where the state legislature backed a plan to build a 65,000-seat stadium downtown.

The 1993 season was the first with the current Patriots logo and font (though a color change would be undergone in 2000).

Sweeping changes were made in the organization before the season. All coaches from the 1992 season with the exception of Dante Scarnecchia and Bobby Grier were fired. Scarnecchia would become a special assistant while Grier would move to the front office. The new head coach was Bill Parcells, who had been a linebackers coach in Foxboro in 1980 under Ron Erhardt.

The roster underwent substantial changes; among the holdovers from the 1992 season were Marv Cook, Ben Coates, Kevin Turner, Michael Timpson, Sam Gash, Greg McMurtry, Vincent Brown, Maurice Hurst, Leonard Russell, Bruce Armstrong, Mike Arthur, and Pat Harlow. The Patriots drafted Drew Bledsoe as the #1 pick and he was named starter.

1993 NFL Draft

Season summary 
The Patriots lost their first four games, even after forcing overtime against the Lions and seeing a last-minute field goal attempt against Seattle bounce off the crossbar. In Week 5 Bledsoe was injured, Scott Secules was named the starting quarterback, and won the game with two passing touchdowns passing and one rushing score in the team's 23–21 win over the Cardinals. Scott Secules was then benched after a 28–14 loss to the Oilers. Bledsoe started for the Patriots, who however lost seven straight before eking out a 7–2 win against the Bengals that was the last occurrence until the 2011 Falcons of a team scoring only a safety in an NFL game. This win was followed by a 20–17 win over the Cleveland Browns – coached by Parcells’ longtime assistant Bill Belichick – and a 38–0 massacre of the Indianapolis Colts in brutal windchill.

The season ended on January 2, 1994, with many in the sellout crowd at Foxboro Stadium believing it would be the final ever game for the New England Patriots before moving to St. Louis. The finale itself became one of the most dramatic games in the team’s history. The Patriots were hosting the Dolphins, who with champion quarterback Dan Marino out for the season after Week Five, had not won since Thanksgiving Day against the Dallas Cowboys and required a win to make the playoffs. The Patriots led 10–7 at halftime and twice stopped the Dolphins on downs, but early in the third a Bledsoe fumble led to a Dolphins field goal. A blocked punt by the Dolphins’ Darrell Malone led to a touchdown by Scott Mitchell to Mark Ingram. The game lead tied or changed five times in the fourth quarter. In the fourth the Dolphins completed a drive ending in a Terry Kirby touchdown run, this despite Andre Tippett's sack of Mitchell for a ten-yard loss – it was the 100th career sack for the future Hall Of Fame linebacker.

In the final 3:40 Bledsoe drove the Patriots down to a Ben Coates touchdown catch, but the Dolphins forced overtime on a Pete Stoyanovich field goal. In the overtime the Dolphins punted after Chris Slade forced a fumble, then Bledsoe was picked off by J.B. Brown before the Dolphins had to punt again. Vincent Brisby caught a ten-yard pass but fumbled; teammate Leonard Russell recovered the ball and ran 22 yards; Bledsoe then absorbed a Dolphins blitz and launched a 36-yard touchdown to Michael Timpson, ending a wild 33–27 Patriots win. This finished their season at 5–11, but with four straight wins and eliminating the Dolphins from the playoffs as a finale.

This win over Miami marked only the sixth time that the Pats had defeated a team with a winning record since the start of 1989.

Staying in Foxborough
As it turned out, the Patriots would not be leaving for the Midwest after all. Despite owner James Orthwein’s best efforts, Foxboro Stadium owner Robert Kraft was unwilling to let the team out of its lease, which ran through the end of the 2001 season. An effort by Orthwein to buy his way out of the terms of the lease was rejected outright by Kraft; since Orthwein had intended to relocate the Patriots when he purchased the team from Victor Kiam before the previous season, and Kraft said he would challenge any relocation bid in court, he was left with little choice but to put the team up for sale since he no longer desired to do business in New England. Kraft would make a bid for the franchise that would eventually be accepted, and the Patriots remained in Foxborough.

Staff

Roster

Regular season

Schedule

Standings

Notes

References

External links 
 1993 New England Patriots at Pro-Football-Reference.com

New England Patriots
New England Patriots seasons
New England Patriots
Sports competitions in Foxborough, Massachusetts